The CABAL II is a ballistic combat helmet of Argentine origin. The helmet is made of aramid fibre and is similar in design to the Advanced Combat Helmet but with a more sloped front.

Users

References

See also
 OR-201

Combat helmets of Argentina